Pseudonocardia autotrophica is a bacterium from the genus of Pseudonocardia. Pseudonocardia autotrophica produces antifungal compounds.

References

Further reading
 
 
 
 
 

Pseudonocardia
Bacteria described in 1956